Johnson-Hatfield Tavern is a historic tavern house located at Redstone Township, Fayette County, Pennsylvania.  It was built about 1817, and is a -story, 5-bay, stone building with a center hall plan. Also on the property is a stone spring house. It served as a stop for 19th-century travelers on the National Road.

It was added to the National Register of Historic Places in 1995.

References

Houses on the National Register of Historic Places in Pennsylvania
Houses completed in 1817
Houses in Fayette County, Pennsylvania
National Register of Historic Places in Fayette County, Pennsylvania